Valsolda is a comune (municipality) of about 1,400 inhabitants in the Province of Como in the Italian region Lombardy on the border with Switzerland.

Valsolda (Vallis Solida in Latin) gives the name to the river Soldo who cuts across the valley. The municipality was formed in 1927 and it is subdivided into nine villages: Cressogno, San Mamete (the municipal seat), Albogasio, Oria and Santa Margherita on the shores of Lake Lugano, as well as Loggio, Drano, Puria, Dasio and Castello on the mountains above.

Valsolda is home to the largest natural reserve in Lombardy with over 785 acres of forest populated by deer, roes, chamois, yews, foxes, eagles, hawks and sparrows.

Valsolda was the set of some the works of novelist Antonio Fogazzaro, including Malombra (1881) and Piccolo mondo antico (1895); his house in Oria is still visitable. Other notable figures from the area include painter Paolo Pagani, architect Pellegrino Tibaldi, writer and journalist Brunella Gasperini, TV anchors Victoria Cabello and Kurt Felix, singer Paola Del Medico and the family of World champion figureskater Gundi Busch.

Valsolda borders the following municipalities: Cadro (Switzerland), Cimadera (Switzerland), Claino con Osteno (Italy), Alta Valle Intelvi (Italy), Lugano (Switzerland), Porlezza (Italy), Sonvico (Switzerland), Val Rezzo (Italy) and Villa Luganese (Switzerland).

Valsolda is twinned with the town of Węgrów in Poland.

References

External links
Official website  
Pro Loco Valsolda  
Museo Casa Pagani   
Premio Antonio Fogazzaro  
Information and images on Valsolda only IE 

Cities and towns in Lombardy
Italy–Switzerland border crossings
Italy–Switzerland border